Crassicantharus noumeensis, common name the gold-banded latirus, is a species of sea snail, a marine gastropod mollusk in the family Dolicholatiridae.

Description
The size of the shell varies between 8 mm and 25 mm.

Distribution
This marine species occurs in the Eastern Indian Ocean; off Hawaii, Japan, Mauritius, New Caledonia, Oceania, Philippines and Australia (Western Australia)

References

 Crosse, H. 1870. Diagnoses Molluscorum Novae Caledoniae incolarum. Journal de Conchyliologie 18: 138–248
 Kay, E.A. 1979. Hawaiian Marine Shells. Reef and shore fauna of Hawaii. Section 4 : Mollusca. Honolulu, Hawaii : Bishop Museum Press Bernice P. Bishop Museum Special Publication Vol. 64(4) 653 pp.
 Wilson, B. (1994) Australian marine shells. Prosobranch gastropods. Vol. 2 Neogastropods. Odyssey Publishing, Kallaroo, Western Australia, 370 pp. page(s): 67

External links
 

Gastropods